Stella Rebner is an American bridge player.

Bridge accomplishments

Wins

 North American Bridge Championships (5)
 Barclay Trophy (2) 1952, 1953 
 Chicago Mixed Board-a-Match (1) 1963 
 Wagar Women's Knockout Teams (2) 1957, 1962

Runners-up

 World Olympiad Womens Teams Championship (1) 1964
 North American Bridge Championships (1)
 Rockwell Mixed Pairs (1) 1959

Notes

American contract bridge players